Malcolm Le Grice (born May 1940, in Plymouth, United Kingdom) is a British artist known for his avant-garde film work.

Biography
The British Film Institute claims that he "is probably the most influential modernist filmmaker in British cinema".

Le Grice was born in 1940, and studied at Slade School of Art, London. He founded the London Film-Makers' Co-op workshop in the late 1960s, at the same time introducing film to fine art students at Saint Martin's School of Art and Goldsmiths College, London. He has balanced his continuing practice as a filmmaking artist with campaigning for the artform in print,  in higher education, and in committees at the British Film Institute and the Arts Council.

Le Grice started as a painter but began to make film and computer works in the mid 1960s. Since then he has shown regularly in Europe and the US and his work has been screened in many international film festivals, including recent retrospectives at Media City Film Festival (2015) and RedCat in Los Angeles (2019). He has also shown in major art exhibitions like the Paris Biennale No.8, Arte Inglese Oggi, Milan, Une Histoire du Cinema, Paris, Documenta 6, Kassel, X-Screen at the Museum of Modern Art, Vienna, and Behind the Facts at the Fundació Joan Miró, Barcelona.

His work has been screened at the Museum of Modern Art, New York, the Louvre Museum in Paris and the Tate Modern and Tate Britain in London and is in permanent collections including: the Centre Georges Pompidou, Paris; the Royal Belgian Film Archive, Brussels; the National Film Library of Australia, Canberra; German Cinamatheque Archive, Berlin; Canadian Distribution Centre, Montreal and Archives du Film Experimental D'Avignon. A number of longer films have been transmitted on British TV, including 'Finnegans Chin', 'Sketches for a Sensual Philosophy' and 'Chronos Fragmented'. His main work since the mid 1980s is in video and digital media and includes the multi-projection video installation works 'The Cyclops Cycle' and 'Treatise'.
 
Le Grice has written critical and theoretical work including a history of experimental cinema 'Abstract Film and Beyond' (1977, Studio Vista and MIT). For three years in the 1970s he wrote a regular column for the art monthly Studio International and has published numerous other articles on film, video and digital media. Many of these were collected and published under the title 'Experimental Cinema in the Digital Age' by the British Film Institute (2001). Le Grice is a Professor Emeritus of the University of the Arts London.

References 

1940 births
Living people
English film directors
British experimental filmmakers
Artists from Plymouth, Devon
Alumni of the Slade School of Fine Art
Alumni of the Plymouth College of Art
Mass media people from Devon